"Mojo Pin" is the first song on Jeff Buckley's 1994 album Grace. It was written by Jeff Buckley and Gary Lucas, and was first introduced on his EP, Live at Sin-é. Buckley stated that the song was about a dream of a black woman.  Through a wash of bizarre images, the lyrics convey a feeling of addiction, either to drugs or a person.  In Buckley's words, "Sometimes if somebody you feel you need... the whole universe tells you that you have to have her, you start watching her favorite TV shows all night, you start buying her the things she needs, you start drinking her drinks, you start smoking her bad cigarettes, you start picking up her nuances in her voice, you sleep in safe sometimes the most dangerous thing... this is called Mojo Pin."

The song mixes a psychedelic feel, along with a more hard rock tone at intervals throughout the song. The original music for both "Grace" ("Rise Up to Be") and "Mojo Pin" ("And You Will") without Jeff's vocals can be found on Gary Lucas's CD, Level the Playing Field. The song is also featured on the Gary Lucas & Gods and Monster's CD, Coming Clean, with vocals by Michael Schoen.

Live versions of the song featured a long introduction entitled "Chocolate" in which Jeff imitated the vocal style of Nusrat Fateh Ali Khan.

References

External links
 Jeff Buckley official website
 Jeff Buckley at Columbia Records
 Gary Lucas Discography
 What is a mojo pin?

1994 songs
Jeff Buckley songs
Songs written by Gary Lucas
Songs written by Jeff Buckley